Jack Swift Berry (January 9, 1887 – June 27, 1967) was a forestry expert and lumberman and then two-term member of the California State Legislature from the Republican Party.

Background

Jack Swift Berry was born on January 9, 1887, in Tecumseh, Nebraska.  Both his parents died young, so a grandmother raised Berry and his brother. In 1903, Berry worked as a logger in Black Hills, South Dakota.  In 1906, he studied at the Biltmore Forest School in North Carolina; in 1907, he obtained a degree as Forester.

Career

Forestry

In July 1907, he entered the United States Forestry Service in Washington, DC, as a forest assistant. In 1908, he was transferred successively to: Holy Cross National Forest in Glenwood, Colorado, Arapaho National Forest in Sulphur Springs, Colorado, and the newly created District 5, headquartered in San Francisco, California, where he worked in timber sales.  He earned an advance degree from the Biltmore Forest School, in part due to a thesis on logging and lumber flumes in California.  In 1912, he became Forest Examiner and in 1916 became Logging Engineer District 5 (in charge of stumpage for all California forests).

World War I

In 1917, Berry joined the US Army Corps of Engineers and served in World War I.  He served as a major in an advance party of the Tenth Engineers, Forestry Department, for the American Expeditionary Forces including time in Bordeaux and Paris (1917-1919).

Forestry

In September 1919, he became a forest (timber) valuation engineer for the California pine and redwood region at the United States Bureau of Internal Revenue, based in San Francisco.  In 1921, he worked as a forest engineer for a small company.  In 1923, he served as secretary of the California Forest Protective Association. His 1921 study in forestry received recognition from the California State Board of Forestry in 1923.

Lumber

In 1924, Berry served as general manager of the Michigan-California Lumber Company ("Michigan Cal") through 1949.  (The Michigan-California Lumber Company owned the Camino, Placerville and Lake Tahoe Railroad (CPLT) railroad.  The CPLT railroad was dismantled beginning in October 1949, with lumber hauled by trucks over a route almost twice as long as the railroad and cable system.)  Berry applied the Biltmore method of sustainable forestry for 90,000 acres of timber. Originally, he worked in Camino, California.  In 1930, he became general manager. In 1933, he had Michigan Cal donate the 4,400-acre Blodgett Forest (near Georgetown, California) to the University of California as a laboratory for its forestry school. In 1942, he helped establish the Amador-El Dorado Forest Forum. In 1950, he formed the Jack Swift Berry Lumber Company in Sacramento, California.

World War II

During World War II, Berry served as a lumber consultant to the National Production Authority.

California State Senate

In 1952, Berry started service as State Senator from the then 9th District comprising El Dorado and Amador counties through 1960. He served as chairman of the Natural Resources Committee.  With Placerville mayor Sandy Murray, he championed the building of U.S. Route 50 in California (US 50) and the Marshall Hospital in Placerville. On November 4, 1952, Berry won a seat as both Republican and Democratic party candidate.  On November 6, 1956, he won again.  On November 8, 1960, he lost and did not run again.  During his first term, Berry went to the hospital to recover from a serious illness:  the California State Senate passed Senate Resolution No. 17 of 1952 to "wish him a speedy and complete recovery."  During his second term in 1957, he opposed a $157,000 "feasibility study" on the Stumpy Meadows reservoir and thus against an $85 million project on the Upper American River by the Sacramento Municipal Utility District (SMUD).

Banking

In 1953, Berry became the first president of the newly formed Mother Lode Bank of Placerville (1953-1975), whose co-founders included Lloyd Raffetto.  He remained president through 1962 when, due to a stroke, he retired.

Personal life and death

In 1912, Berry married Cecile Ball.  They had three children named Jack, William, and Betty Lou.  By 1930, they had divorced.  Later, Berry married Florence B. Berry.

Berry served as president of the Western Pine Association of Portland, Oregon, from 1939 through 1940 and of the Pacific division of the National Association of Wooden Box Shook Makers (1947-1949).

Berry was a long-time member of E Clampus Vitus and the California State Board of Forestry (part of the California Department of Forestry and Fire Protection).

Swift Berry died age 80 on June 27, 1967, in Placerville.  The California State Senate passed Senate Resolution No. 315 of 1967 to commemorate the life and service of J. Swift Berry.

Grandson Phil Berry was a trust lawyer in Placerville.

Awards and legacy

 1962:  Plaque to "Swift Berry: 'Mr. Clamper'... 'A Man to Match Our Mountains'" by E Clampus Vitus in Berry Park, Placerville
 Bell of Shay Locomotive Number 8, presented to Berry, now donated to the Sierra Nevada Logging Museum and located at "Eight Spot"

Works

As the Division of Forestry of the California Department of Natural Resources noted, "Throughout his career, Swift Berry wrote numerous articles and bulletins on forest utilization."

 Shake-Making and Tray Mills in California National Forests (1913)
 Lumbering in the Sugar and Yellow Pine Region of California (1917)
 "Michigan-California Lumber Company" (1957)

See also

 Members of the California State Legislature
 Michigan-California Lumber Company
 Camino, Placerville and Lake Tahoe Railroad (CPLT) railroad
 List of California railroads
 List of company towns in the United States
 Alexander Howison Murray Jr.
 Lloyd Raffetto

References

External links

 North Carolina State University - Special Collections - Swift Berry biography
 North Carolina State University - Special Collections - Swift Berry's Botany Notebook
 Phillip S. Berry, Sierra Club leader, 1960s-1980s
 E Clampus Vitus
 UC Berkeley - Fritz-Metcalf Photograph Collection - Michigan-California Lumber Company photos
 Calisphere - Sawmill of Michigan-California Lumber Company photo
 Montana Memory Project - Michigan-California Lumber Company cable-way photo
 Pacific Cost Narrow Gauge - Michigan-California Lumber Co. photo
 APRHF Train Web - Michigan-California Lumber Company brief history
 Swift Berry Political History

1887 births
1967 deaths
20th-century American politicians
Republican Party California state senators
People from Placerville, California
People from El Dorado County, California
People from Tecumseh, Nebraska
United States Army personnel of World War I
Biltmore Forest School